Massachusetts House of Representatives' 3rd Plymouth district in the United States is one of 160 legislative districts included in the lower house of the Massachusetts General Court. It covers parts of Norfolk County and Plymouth County. Democrat Joan Meschino of Hull has represented the district since 2017.

Towns represented
The district includes the following localities:
 Cohasset
 part of Hingham
 Hull
 part of Scituate

The current district geographic boundary overlaps with that of the Massachusetts Senate's Plymouth and Norfolk district.

Former locales
The district previously covered:
 Hanover, circa 1872 
 Hanson, circa 1872 
 South Scituate, circa 1872

Representatives
 Lemuel C. Waterman, circa 1858 
 Benjamin F. Burgess, circa 1859 
 Henry A. Turner, circa 1888 
 Walter Shuebruk, circa 1920 
 Nathaniel M. Hurwitz, circa 1951 
 George Chester Young, circa 1975 
 Joan Meschino, 2017-current

See also
 List of Massachusetts House of Representatives elections
 Other Plymouth County districts of the Massachusetts House of Representatives: 1st, 2nd,  4th, 5th, 6th, 7th, 8th, 9th, 10th, 11th, 12th
 List of Massachusetts General Courts
 List of former districts of the Massachusetts House of Representatives

Images
Portraits of legislators

References

External links
 Ballotpedia
  (State House district information based on U.S. Census Bureau's American Community Survey).
 League of Women Voters of Hingham

House
Government of Plymouth County, Massachusetts
Government of Norfolk County, Massachusetts